Special is an American comedy-drama streaming television series created by Ryan O'Connell for Netflix. Starring O'Connell, the series is a semi-autobiographical account of his life as a gay man with cerebral palsy pursuing new friendships, relationships, and self-sufficiency. It is based on O'Connell's memoir I'm Special: And Other Lies We Tell Ourselves.

The series premiered on April 12, 2019, and concluded on May 20, 2021, after two seasons. It received positive reviews and earned four nominations at the 71st Primetime Creative Arts Emmy Awards, one for Outstanding Short Form Comedy or Drama Series and three for the performances of O'Connell, Jessica Hecht, and Punam Patel.

Synopsis
Special is "a distinctive and uplifting new series about a gay man, Ryan, with mild cerebral palsy who decides to rewrite his identity and finally go after the life he wants."

Cast and characters

Main

 Ryan O'Connell as Ryan Hayes, an unpaid intern at Eggwoke
 Jessica Hecht as Karen Hayes, Ryan's mother
 Punam Patel as Kim Laghari, Ryan's friend and co-worker at Eggwoke
 Marla Mindelle as Olivia, Ryan and Kim's boss
 Augustus Prew as Carey, one of Kim's best friends. 
 Patrick Fabian as Phil, Karen's new neighbor and love interest
 Max Jenkins as Tanner (season 2), Ryan's love interest who is in an open relationship with a man named Richard

Recurring

 Gina Hughes as Samantha, Ryan and Kim's co-worker at Eggwoke
 Buck Andrews as Henry (season 2), a neurodivergent love interest of Ryan

Guest stars
 Kat Rogers as Caitie
 Jason Michael Snow as Keaton
 Brian Jordan Alvarez as Shay
Shalita Grant as Rae
 Charlie Barnett as Harrison (season 2), Kim's love interest. He comes from a poor and difficult background. After the sale of his company he becomes quite wealthy but it comes with a struggle with his family, who wants part of his money. 
 Ana Ortiz as Susan (season 2), Phil's new girlfriend
 Utkarsh Ambudkar as Ravi (season 2), a childhood friend and romantic interest of Kim
 Lauren Weedman as Tonya (season 2), a longtime friend of Karen
 Anjali Bhimani as Bina Laghari (season 2), Kim's mother
 Ajay Mehta as Vijay Laghari (season 2), Kim's father
 Karan Soni as Dev Laghari (season 2), Kim's brother
 Leslie Jordan as Charles (season 2)
 Jeremy Glazer as Marc Miller (season 2), second love interest of Ryan

Episodes

Season 1 (2019)

Season 2 (2021)

Production

Development
On February 5, 2019, Netflix announced that it had given the production a series order for an eight-episode first season. The series is created by Ryan O'Connell, who is credited as an executive producer, alongside Jim Parsons, Anna Dokoza, Eric Norsoph and Todd Spiewak. Production companies involved with the series were slated to consist of That's Wonderful Productions and Stage 13. On December 16, 2019, the series was renewed for a second and final season by Netflix.

Casting
Alongside the series order announcement, it was confirmed that Ryan O'Connell, Jessica Hecht, Punam Patel, Marla Mindelle, Augustus Prew, and Patrick Fabian would star in the series. In February 2020, Max Jenkins was cast in the recurring role for the second season. In March 2021, Charlie Barnett, Ana Ortiz, Utkarsh Ambudkar, Lauren Weedman, Buck Andrews, Anjali Bhimani, Ajay Mehta, and Karan Soni joined the cast in recurring roles while Leslie Jordan was cast to guest star.

Release
On March 25, 2019, Netflix released the first official trailer for the series. The first season, consisting of 8 episodes, was released on Netflix on April 12, 2019. The second season was released on May 20, 2021.

Reception

Critical response
The first season received positive reviews upon its release. On review aggregator Rotten Tomatoes, the series holds an approval rating of 95% with an average rating of 7.29/10 based on 22 reviews. The website's critical consensus reads, "Honest and genuinely affecting, Special lives up to its name with a funny—if a bit too concise—first season brightened by Ryan O'Connell's infectious charms. On Metacritic, it has a weighted average score of 66 out of 100, based on 9 critics, indicating "generally favorable reviews". Variety gave the show a positive review calling the main character "quick and snarky, deeply insecure and sometimes more selfish than he's willing to admit. He makes mistakes and pays for them, undergoing a hell of a lot of change in the short time Special gets to show it." TV Guide gave the show a mixed review saying that, "Hopefully Special gets a second season with a bigger budget, a writing staff, and more time to plan. The way Season 1 improves as it goes along shows Special still has a lot of potential."

Accolades

References

External links 
 
 

2010s American LGBT-related comedy television series
2020s American LGBT-related comedy television series
2019 American television series debuts
2021 American television series endings
American LGBT-related web series
Gay-related television shows
English-language Netflix original programming
Television series by Warner Bros. Television Studios
Works about cerebral palsy and other paralytic syndromes
Films about disability